Herbert Constantine "Bistek" Maclang Bautista (born May 12, 1968) is a Filipino actor and politician who served as mayor of Quezon City, the Philippines' largest city by population, from 2010 to 2019.

Bautista has starred in numerous films and TV shows, including the 1984 coming-of-age film Bagets, the horror anthology series Shake, Rattle & Roll, and the children's show Kaluskos Musmos.

Early life and education
He was born on May 12, 1968, in Quezon City to Herminio "Butch" Bautista (1934–2017), who became a two-term city councilor from the fourth district, and Rosario "Baby" Maclang (1947–2008), a restaurateur. He has two siblings, Hero (an incumbent Quezon City councilor from the 4th district) and Harlene (formerly married to Romnick Sarmienta). Herbert Bautista took Bachelor of Laws at New Era University though he did not finish it.

In 1992, he graduated from the San Beda College of Manila with a baccalaureate degree in Philosophy and Letters. He was adjudged Most Outstanding Centennial Bedan Alumnus in recognition of his contribution and leadership in civil governance and politics. He has a Master of Arts degree in Public Administration from the National College of Public Administration and Governance (NCPAG) at the University of the Philippines Diliman. Bautista is an alumnus of the National Defense College of the Philippines where he obtained his Master in National Security Administration (MNSA) degree. He is working towards his Doctorate degree in Political Science UP Diliman.

Acting career
Bautista has been acting since he was 10 years old. He originally intended to become a dramatic actor with his introverted personality, but later on grew to be known as a comedian onscreen. films He was part of the popular gag show Kaluskos Musmos, which featured a scrappy bunch of children acting out adulthood for laughs. The show ran from the late 1970s to the mid-1980s.

He was known for his role as Reneboy in the hugely successful soap opera Flordeluna, which was aired on RPN-9 from 1978 to 1984.

Filmography
Oh My Mama (1981)
Bagets (1984) as Gilbert
Hotshots (1984)
Julian Vaquero (1984) as Dencio
Bagets 2 (1984) as Gilbert
Shake, Rattle & Roll (1984) Douglas ("Manananggal" segment) 
Like Father, Like Son (1985) as Mariano "Nanoy" Batobalani
Ma'am May We Go Out? (1985) as John Ramos
Working Boys (1985) as Kermit
Ninja Kids (1986) as Dodo
Captain Barbell (1986) as Tengteng
Takbo...! Bilis...! Takboooo (1987)
Puto (1987) as Ivanhoe "Puto" de la Cruz
Jack & Jill (1987) as Hilario/Jill
Kumander Bawang: Kalaban ng Mga Aswang (1988) as Tikboy / Kumander Bawang
Jockey Tyan (1988) as Juan/Johnny
Jack & Jill sa Amerika (1988) as Hilario/Jill
Pik Pak Boom (1988) as Danny/Berto
M & M: The Incredible Twins (1989) as Marcelino
Dear Diary (1989) as Badong/Matthew
Hulihin si Nardong Toothpick (1990) as Nardong Toothpick
Tootsie-Wootsie: Ang Bandang Walang Atrasan (1990)
Robin Good: Sugod Nang Sugod (1991) as Big John
Pitong Gamol (1991) as Jun Halo
Daddy Goon (1992) as Kuliling
Alabang Girls (1992) as Orot/Orly
Mga Syanong Parak (We are cops from the Province) (1993) as Hulyo
Dunkin Donato (1993) as Buknoy
Dobol Trobol (1994) as Wong
Multo in the City (1994) as Oscar
Ten Little Indians (1996) as Michael
Parak: The Bobby Barbers Story (1997) as Pinggoy
Ping Lacson: Supercop (2000) as Rivera
Umaaraw, Umuulan (2006) as Berto
Shake, Rattle and Roll Fourteen: The Invasion (2012) as Donald ("Pamana" segment)
Raketeros (2013) as Berto
Bob Ong's Lumayo Ka Nga sa Akin (2016)
Silly Red Shoes (2019)

Television 
2+2 (1977-1980) (BBC)
Clubhouse 9 (1977-1978) (RPN)
Basta Barkada (1978-1979) (RPN)
Broadkast Workshap (1978-1979) (IBC)
Dr. Potpot & the Satellite Kid (1985) (RPN)
Lovingly Yours (1985-1996) (GMA Network)
The Sharon Cuneta Show (1986-1997) (ABS-CBN)
Kalatong Pinggan (1987-1989) (ABS-CBN)
Ang Tabi Kong Mamaw (1987-1988) (RPN)
Young Love, Sweet Love (1988-1995) (RPN)
Eat Bulaga! (1989-1992) (ABS-CBN)
Bistek (1990-1992?) as Bistek (IBC)
Super Islaw (?) (IBC)
Ready Na Direk (1991-1994) (RPN)
Pandakekoks (1990-1991) (GMA Network)
Alabang Girls: The Sitcom Series (1992-1993) (ABC)
Tondominium (1992-1993) (ABC)
GMA Telecine Specials (1995) (GMA Network)
Mikee (1995) (GMA Network)
Mikee Forever The Sitcom (1994-1995) (GMA Network)
Haybol Rambol (1994–1995) (GMA Network)
Mary D'Potter (2001) (ABS-CBN)
Wow! (2002) (IBC)
Klasmeyts (2002) as Host (ABS-CBN)
Super Inggo (2006) as Kumander Bawang (ABS-CBN)
Super Inggo 1.5: Ang Bagong Bangis (2007) as Kumander Bawang (ABS-CBN)
Sabi ni Nanay (2007) (RPN)
Ikaw Lamang (2014) as Algaro (ABS-CBN)
Make It with You (2020) (ABS-CBN)
Puto (TV Series) as Ivanhoe "Puto" de la Cruz (2021) (TV5 and Sari Sari Channel)
FPJ's Batang Quiapo (2023) (Kapamilya Channel)

Political career
From 1986 to 1989, he was President of the Kabataang Barangay National Federation and was appointed ex officio City Councilor representing the Youth Sector of Quezon City. From 1992 to 1995, he was elected as a regular Councilor of Quezon City from the 3rd district and was concurrently Chairperson of the Committee on Tourism and Cultural Affairs.

He was the youngest Vice Mayor of Quezon City when he was elected into the position in May 1995. Bautista became the first elected bachelor Vice Mayor of Quezon City.

In 1998, he ran for mayor but lost then-incumbent Mel Mathay, who was running for his third and final term. After he suffered defeat in election, he was appointed by then-president Joseph Estrada as commissioner at-large of the National Youth Commission.

In 2001, Bautista returned to politics when he was elected as vice mayor. He ran as the running mate of actor Rudy Fernandez, who lost the mayoralty race to Feliciano "Sonny" Belmonte Jr., who later became his political ally. He was reelected in 2004 and 2007 elections, serving three consecutive terms.

One of the younger officials of the country, who has had a long and fruitful experience in government and the youth movement, Bautista is active in socio-civic activities. He is Board Director of the YMCA-QC, Inc., member of the Rotary Club of Kamuning, District 3780; founding president of the Association of Graduate Students and Alumni of the UP College of Public Administration in Diliman; board director of the Katipunan ng mga Artista sa Pelikulang Pilipino at Telebisyon (KAPPT) and member of the Philippine Constitution Association (PHILCONSA).

Bautista is the National President of the National Movement of Young Legislators (NMYL), a 6,000-member organization composed of vice governors, board members, vice mayors and councilors including Sangguniang Kabataan federation presidents.

On July 1, 2010, he took oath into office as the Mayor of Quezon City after his landslide victory in the 2010 local elections in Quezon City. Bautista defeated one of his opponents, Mel Mathay who defeated him 12 years prior and was running to return to mayoralty. His running mate was Joy Belmonte, daughter of outgoing mayor Sonny Belmonte. She was also successful in the vice mayoral race. Their oath with the elder Belmonte as a congressman and the city councilors was administered by Chief Justice Renato Corona. He was reelected in 2013 and 2016, serving two consecutive terms, before stepping down in 2019 due to term limits.

On October 6, 2021, Bautista announced that he is running for senator in the 2022 Philippine Senate election, his first venture into national politics after serving Quezon City for 3 decades. However, on February 10, 2022, he was dropped from the senatorial slate of Lacson–Sotto.

Military career

Herbert Bautista joined the reserve force of the AFP through the Reserve Command, PA and was subsequently enlisted as a Master Sergeant in the Philippine Army with completion of his Basic ROTC with then San Beda ROTC Unit.

He reported to the 131st (Standby Reserve) Division, PA and was given the designation of Brigade Sergeant Major of the newly formed Light Armor Brigade (Reserve).

He applied for a commission when he was Vice Mayor of Quezon City and was commissioned with the rank of Army Captain.

He resigned his commissioned as an Army Captain and was recommissioned as a Lieutenant Colonel through the commissioning program of the Master in National Security Administration (AFP Circular Nr. 30) of the National Defense College of the Philippines. In 2018, he was promoted to the rank of Brigadier General. He is the Commanding Officer of the 1502nd Infantry Brigade (Ready Reserve) which is a component of the 15th Infantry Division (Ready Reserve), Army Reserve Command.

Awards
Best Actor | Shake, Rattle and Roll | Metro Manila Film Festival, 1984
Best Supporting Actor | Bobby Barbers: Parak | Famas, 1997

References

External links
Profile at the Quezon City website

Article on Herbert Bautista at Telebisyon.net

|-

|-

|-

1968 births
Living people
Filipino actor-politicians
Filipino male child actors
Filipino male comedians
Filipino male television actors
Male actors from Metro Manila
Mayors of Quezon City
Laban ng Demokratikong Pilipino politicians
Lakas–CMD politicians
Liberal Party (Philippines) politicians
Nationalist People's Coalition politicians
New Era University alumni
People from Quezon City
Tagalog people
Quezon City Council members
San Beda University alumni